Chronotherapy, also called chronotherapeutics or chronotherapeutic drug delivery, 
refers to the  coordination of therapeutic treatments with an individual's circadian or other rhythmic cycles. This may be done to maximize effectiveness of a specific treatment, minimize possible side effects, or both.  

In the treatment of psychiatric conditions including bipolar depression, a form of chronotherapy combining intermittent sleep deprivation and morning bright light has shown efficacy and relative tolerability in a number of controlled studies.

See also 

 Personalized medicine

References 

Circadian rhythm
Therapy